Group A of the 1994 FIFA World Cup was one of six groups of four teams competing at the 1994 World Cup in the United States. The first matches were played June 18, 1994 and the final games took place simultaneously on June 26, 1994.

The group consisted of one CONCACAF team, the host United States; two UEFA teams, Switzerland and Romania; and one CONMEBOL team, Colombia. Romania won the group, Switzerland finished second and also the United States advanced to the knockout stage as one of the best third-placed teams. Colombia finished last with only three points.

Standings

Matches
All times listed are local time.

United States vs Switzerland

Colombia vs Romania

Romania vs Switzerland

Note: Switzerland's fourth goal is also credited to Georges Bregy.

United States vs Colombia
The match between the United States and Colombia saw the United States go ahead with just over 10 minutes to play in the first half, when Colombia defender Andrés Escobar turned a United States cross into his own net. The United States extended their lead early in the second half through Earnie Stewart, while Colombia could only manage a last-minute consolation goal and ended up losing 2–1. The result meant Colombia's chances of qualifying were no longer in their own hands; they would need to beat Switzerland and hope the United States would beat Romania to stand any chance of qualifying as one of the four best third-placed teams. Escobar was blamed for the result by Colombians and was murdered shortly after returning to the country.

Switzerland vs Colombia
To have any hope of finishing in third place and a potential spot in the round of 16, Colombia needed a victory against already-qualified Switzerland, and took the lead through Hernán Gaviria just before half-time. Gaviria was substituted late in the second half, and his replacement, Harold Lozano, doubled Colombia's lead in the last minute of the game. Colombia had managed the win they needed, but they still required the United States to beat Romania in the group's other final game.

United States vs Romania
Starting the day in third place, Romania needed a win to guarantee progress to the knockout phase. The United States' qualification was already practically assured, but a win for the host nation would open the door for Colombia to qualify ahead of Romania with victory over Switzerland. That prospect was ended in the 18th minute, when Dan Petrescu scored the only goal of the game for Romania, giving them a 1–0 win. Combined with Switzerland's loss to Colombia, that meant Romania finished top of the group, followed by Switzerland, with the United States in third. The United States ultimately qualified as one of the four best third-placed teams.

References

Group A 1994 FIFA World Cup
Group
Group
Group A
Group